Ongar  is an outer western suburb of Dublin, Ireland. Developed on a greenfield basis since 2001, it comprises the townlands of Castaheany (northerly) and "Hansfield or Phibblestown" (southerly), within the ancient Barony of Castleknock, County Dublin. It is close to Castleknock, Blanchardstown and Clonsilla.  The development has a number of amenities on the main street, there are several schools in the area, and the nearby railway line at Hansfield railway station connects to the Luas Green Line and ultimately the N3 national route / M3 motorway.  Employers in the nearby business parks and "Greater Blanchardstown" include Intel, Hewlett Packard, IBM, Kepak and eBay.

History 
The area was a new build, developing the lands of the stud farm called Ongar, once the residence of Hollywood star Rita Hayworth and her husband Prince Aly Khan. Another part of the area covers the farm and lands belonging to Phibblestown House (built c. 1840). 

Building of the new suburban development started in 2001 on the site of the former stud farm and was ongoing as recently as 2009.  The facade of Ongar House has been preserved, and the house itself was sold in 2013. In 2019 Ongar House was refurbished and is now an apartment block.

Ongar and its surrounding areas were built up with a mix of housing types - apartments, duplexes and houses - and with a concentration of services on one street.

Location and access 
Ongar is centred on the townland of "Hansfield or Phibblestown" and is contained within the old civil parish of Clonsilla. The village of Clonee is 2 kilometres to the north, while Clonsilla is roughly 2 km to the east, and Blanchardstown Shopping Centre, and the actual village of Blanchardstown, are 3−3.5 km away. Ongar is in the Dublin 15 postal district.

The Royal Canal passes to the south, and small streams run in the area.

Road
To the north is the Littlepace interchange of the N3 national route, which just after becomes the M3 motorway. Pedestrian access is possible to the townland of Castaheany to the north where the tree-lined avenue, house and walled garden of Phibblestown House have been preserved. In this townland, a primary and secondary school are located.

Dublin Bus routes 39 and 39A serve Ongar.

Commuter rail

Ongar is served by Hansfield railway station, which opened in June 2013 and is a 10/15 minute walk from Ongar. The station is on the Dublin Docklands to Dunboyne railway station / M3 Parkway railway station commuter route, its position on the Dunboyne commuter line sees it served by 45 trains daily, with a peak journey time of 25 minutes to Docklands or Connolly Station, itself a spur off the Dublin to Maynooth commuter route to the west of Clonsilla Station. Connection to the Luas Green Line, and ultimately the whole Luas system, is possible via the Luas Broombridge stop.

Amenities 

As a greenfield development, Ongar's master plan provided for a new "main street" on which most commercial development would be concentrated, with the intention that it would emulate a traditional Irish village. As of 2004, this street had a number of services including a supermarket, newsagent's, grocery shops, off-licence, betting shop, hairdressers and a number of eating places.

Education 
Castaheaney Educate Together Primary School moved to a permanent location in Ongar in June 2008. Scoil Benedict opened in 2010, having been located temporarily in Littlepace during construction; the school has one of the largest astroturf pitches in ireland. 

Coláiste Pobail Setanta secondary school is in nearby Phibblestown and was opened in 2008; it shares a campus with Scoil Ghrainne Primary school.

An Educate Together school complex, West Blanchardstown Primary and Secondary School, has received government funding to build schools in or near Ongar, close by the new Hansfield Station - and having been scheduled to open in September 2014 was still pending as of August 2018.

Community
In 2018, Ongar entered the Tidy Towns competition, scoring 236 points out of 450. A 3-year plan was also submitted, to involve areas of improvement such as "streetscape & public places," "green spaces and landscaping," "nature and biodiversity" and "tidiness and litter control". Several routes for cycling and walking have been created in the area, and Fingal County Council has worked with the local schools and community to improve amenities for pedestrians and cyclists.

Ongar is the location of an Irish language organisation, Pobal Gaeilge 15, which serves Dublin 15. There are local Irish language classes, a parent and child group, as well as social nights and an annual 'Féile'.

Sport
The area is served by two Gaelic Athletic Association clubs, Erin go Bragh GAA, which moved to nearby Littlepace in 2003, and Westmanstown Gaels at the Garda Síochána sports grounds in Westmanstown, near Clonsilla. For soccer, Clonee United, also based in Littlepace, was formed in 2003 through the amalgamation of two clubs, Casta Celtic, formed in 2002, and Little Pacers F.C., established in 2000, while Santos Soccer Club plays beside the Phibblestown Community Centre. Erin Go Bragh and Clonee United run under-age "nurseries". The Ongar Chasers basketball club is in Phibblestown Community Centre. Ongar Karate Club is in the Ongar Community Centre, beside Scoil Benedict.

Gallery

See also
List of towns and villages in Ireland

References

External links

 Ongar Community Council website (archived 2012)
 Irish Times article - 'A new community like Ongar is a blank canvas' (2012)

Places in Fingal
Towns and villages in Fingal
Castleknock (barony)